Carl E. Ring (May 17, 1902 – June 11, 1991) was an American hurdler. He competed in the men's 110 metres hurdles at the 1928 Summer Olympics.

References

External links
 

1902 births
1991 deaths
Athletes (track and field) at the 1928 Summer Olympics
American male hurdlers
Olympic track and field athletes of the United States
Sportspeople from Bangor, Maine
Track and field athletes from Maine